"A Man and a Woman" is the seventh track on U2's eleventh studio album, How To Dismantle An Atomic Bomb. An acoustic version of the song showed up on the "All Because of You" single. It has been performed live only once at the Clinton Foundation.

Writing and composition

"A Man and a Woman" emerged after U2's engineer was trying a mix of something the band had recorded. Lead singer Bono liked it and soon started to play the bass guitar and singing. The acoustic guitar that the Edge is playing in the song was taken from another completely different song, they chopped it up and connected together with the new one. It was inspiring to Bono to keep working on that. Bono cites Thin Lizzy founding member Phil Lynott as the influence for the style in which he sings the song.

Bono, who has been interested in the distance that lies between men and women, wrote this song about rediscovering a kind of flirtatious and romantic love. The Edge classes "A Man and a Woman" as the wild card on How to Dismantle an Atomic Bomb.

Personnel

U2
Bono – vocals
The Edge – guitar, backing vocals, additional percussion
Adam Clayton – bass guitar
Larry Mullen, Jr. – drums, percussion

Additional performers
Jacknife Lee – synthesizers

Technical
Production – Jacknife Lee
Additional production – Steve Lillywhite, Carl Glanville
Recording – Glanville
Recording assistance – Chris Heaney
Mixing – Lee
Mix engineering – Simon Gogerly, Greg Collins

References
Footnotes

Bibliography

External links
A Man and a Woman lyrics at U2.com

Man and a Woman, A
Man and a Woman, A
Man and a Woman, A
Man and a Woman, A
Man and a Woman, A
Man and a Woman, A
Man and a Woman, A